Patrick Senécal is a French-Canadian writer and scenarist known for his horror oriented drama novels.
Senécal is well known in Québec for his unique dark genre; his work has often been compared to that of Stephen King. Three of his novels were adapted into films in his native Québec.

Personal life
Senécal holds a bachelor's degree in French studies from the Université de Montréal. He was also a teacher for ten years at the Cégep de Drummondville.

Books

Novels
1994 5150 rue des Ormes
1995 Le Passager
1998 Sur le Seuil
2000 Aliss
2002 Sept Jours du Talion
2004 Oniria
2007 Le Vide
2009 Hell.com
2010 Against God (Contre Dieu)
2011 Malphas 1. Le Cas des casiers carnassiers
2012 Malphas 2. Torture, luxure et lecture
2013 Malphas 3. Ce qui se passe dans la cave reste dans la cave
2014 Malphas 4. Grande Liquidation
2015 Faims
2016 L'Autre Reflet
2017 Il Y Aura Des Morts
2019 Ceux de là-bas
2021 Flots
2022 Résonnance

Youth novels
2007 Sept comme Setteur
2010 Madame Wenham.

Collaborative work
2013 Quinze minutes (L’Orphéon)

Short stories
1998 Ressac 
1999 La Source
1999 Eaux troubles
2000 Nuit d’ancre 
2001 Retrouvailles
2005 Équilibre 
2007 Drummondville 
2009 Vente avec démonstration 
2011 Famme 
2014 Public cible
2014 « », in Des nouvelles du père

Graphic novels
2014 Sale Canal (With Tristan Demers)
2020 Aliss (with Jeik Dion)

Filmography

Awards

|-
| 2001
| Aliss
| Prix Boréal : Best novel
| 
|-
| 2006
| Sur le Seuil
| Prix Masterton : Francophone novel
| 
|-
| 2006
| Chambre no 13
| Gémeaux : Scenario
| 
|-
| 2007
| Le Vide
| Prix Saint-Pacôme : Best Quebeker crime fiction
| 
|-
| 2007
| Le Vide
| La Presse du Salon du livre de Montréal : Public's Choice
| 
|-
| 2008
| Le Vide
| Grand Prix des auteurs de la Montérégie : Jury's Price
| 
|-
| 2009
| Hell.com
| Prix du public du Salon du livre de la Côte-Nord
| 
|-
| 2012
| Malphas 2. Torture, luxure et lecture
| La Presse du Salon du livre de Montréal : Public's Choice
| 
|}

References

1967 births
Living people
French Quebecers
People from Drummondville
Writers from Quebec
Canadian horror writers